Austin Harlan Leeds (born May 3, 1978) is an American DJ, recording artist, remixer, record producer and songwriter. Leeds has had a number of entries on the Billboard 200 and his work was mentioned in publications such as Rolling Stone and Billboard.

Career
Originally a guitar player, Leeds turned to DJing in 1997 and rapidly became known for his technical accuracy and black-belt programming. Leeds' work has attracted the attention of numerous major DJs and producers across the globe. Releases with labels such as Bedrock, Zone UK, Bliss, Spinnin, Ultra, Sony, Warner plus inclusion on various compilations amplified his stature. Austin's studio collaborations comprise well known artists and DJs including Paul Van Dyk, Avicii, Nadia Ali, Alex M.O.R.P.H., Starkillers (aka Nick Terranova), Jimmy Van M, Andy Moor, Benny Benassi, Cass & Slide, Mara, Deep Funk Project, Innate, Nu-breed and Origin. Leeds' professional and stylish creations are regularly included on major DJ releases by the likes of Deep Dish and Sasha & John Digweed.

Chart success
The following albums by Paul Van Dyk have charted on the Billboard 200 and feature work by Austin Leeds. In Between peaked at #2 on Sep. 1, 2007. It includes New York City by Paul van Dyk, Starkillers and Austin Leeds feat. Ashley Tomberlin. Cream Ibiza peaked at #24 on August 9, 2008. It includes This Is What You Need by Nick Terranova and Austin Leeds, Another You, Another Me remixed by Nick Terranova and Austin Leeds, and New York City (Cream Ibiza Night Mix) by Paul van Dyk, Starkillers and Austin Leeds feat. Ashley Tomberlin. Volume: The Best of Paul Van Dyk peaked at #4 on June 27, 2009. It includes New York City by Paul van Dyk, Starkillers and Austin Leeds feat. Ashley Tomberlin. Evolution peaked at #13 on April 21, 2012. It includes Symmetries feat. Austin Leeds and the album's lead single Verano, also featuring Austin Leeds. Shake Me by Nick Terranova & Austin Leeds reached number 52 on the Dance Club Songs chart on April 8, 2006.

Communicate, a mix album by British DJ duo Sasha & John Digweed, includes 'Force 51' featuring Leeds. The double CD debuted at number 149 on the Billboard 200, higher than any previous mix album.

Albums

Studio albums
2009– Sound System
2008– Dirty Sound II/ Love Machine
2008– Nervous Nitelife: Vegas

Singles

References 

American DJs
1978 births
Living people